Gina Parvaneh Cody  is a Canadian-Iranian engineer and business leader.

In 1989, Gina became the first woman in Canada to earn a PhD in building engineering. In 2018, following her donation of $15 million, Concordia University renamed its faculty of engineering and computer science after her (the Gina Cody School of Engineering and Computer Science), making it the first university engineering and computer science faculty to be named after a woman in Canada, and internationally.

Early life and education 
Cody was born in Iran in 1956. Her father owned a boy's high school, where Cody would teach during the summer. Cody's three brothers became engineers, while her sister became a dentist. In 1978, Cody completed a Bachelor of Science degree in structural engineering at Aryamehr University of Technology (now called Sharif University of Technology).

She left Iran for Canada in 1979 with $2,000. At this point, Cody's brother had completed a Bachelor's of Engineering at Concordia University in Montreal, and arranged for her to meet with the engineering professor Cedric Marsh. Through this meeting, Cody received a scholarship in engineering to attend Concordia University in Montreal, where she completed a master's degree in engineering in 1981.

In 1989, Cody became the first woman in Canada to earn a PhD in building engineering.

Career 
Following her PhD, Cody moved to Toronto, where she worked for a year on provincial building codes for Ontario's Ministry of Housing (now the Ministry of Municipal Affairs and Housing). Cody then moved to the private sector, where she performed tower crane inspections at Construction Control Inc. (CCI; an Ontario-based engineering consulting company), making her the first woman to climb Toronto construction cranes as an inspector. Cody later became the president of CCI.

Until her retirement, Cody was the executive chair and principal shareholder of CCI Group Inc. Cody sold CCI Group Inc. and retired in 2016. Following a 2016 merger, the CCI Group Inc. now operates as McIntosh Perry Consulting Engineers.

In 2018, Cody donated $15 million to Concordia University, and had its faculty of engineering and computer science named after her (the Gina Cody School of Engineering and Computer Science), making it the first university engineering faculty to be named after a woman in Canada, and one of the first internationally. Her support will foster gender equity, diversity and inclusion through 100 undergraduate and 40 graduate entrance scholarships across the faculty. In addition, it will support the Canada Excellence Research Chair in Smart and Resilient Cities and Communities, and enable next-generation work of three new research chairs in the internet of things, artificial intelligence, and industry 4.0.

Advocate for equity, diversity and inclusion 
Since retiring and making her landmark gift to Concordia University, Cody has become a vocal advocate for equity, diversity and inclusion in science, technology, engineering and math (STEM) fields.

Cody has been invited to speak at dozens of events for major corporations, universities, government, conferences and women’s groups. These include keynote presentations for the Association québécoise des technologies, Autodesk, City of Markham, CCWESTT 2020, Bombardier, Broadcom, Engineers Without Borders Canada, IEEE, Pratt & Whitney, PwC, Qualcomm, Ryerson University, SAP, Siemens, Sunlife, UCLA and Western University.

Board memberships 

 Concordia University
 Canadian Apartment Properties REIT
 European Residential REIT

Other roles and responsibilities 

 Honorary Lieutenant-Colonel of 34 Combat Engineer Regiment (CER)
 Co-chair of the Campaign for Concordia. Next-Gen. Now.
 Chair of Concordia University’s Real Estate Planning Committee
 Chair of the Gina Cody School Advisory Board

Awards 
For her contributions to engineering, business and her community, Cody has received numerous awards, including an Award of Merit from the Canadian Standards Association, a Volunteer Service Award from the Government of Ontario and Officer of the Order of Honour of Professional Engineers Ontario. The Financial Post recognized Construction Control (then under Cody's management) as one of Canada's best managed companies. In 2010, Profit magazine named Cody one of Canada's Top Women Entrepreneurs, and listed CCI as the ninth most profitable Canadian company owned by a woman. The following year, the Concordia University Alumni Association named her Alumna of the Year.
In 2019, Cody was named to the Order of Montreal, and was inducted as a Fellow of the Canadian Academy of Engineering. In 2020, Cody was named one of Canada's Top 25 Women of Influence. In 2021, she was appointed as a Member of the Order of Canada.

Personal life 
Cody currently resides in Toronto and is married to Thomas Cody, a Concordia MBA graduate and retired Bank of America Canada senior vice-president. Cody met her husband at Concordia University. The couple have two daughters: Roya and Tina Cody.

References 

1957 births
Iranian emigrants to Canada
Concordia University alumni
Sharif University of Technology alumni
Canadian women engineers
Living people
21st-century women engineers
20th-century women engineers
Members of the Order of Canada